The GM Small Gasoline Engine (SGE) is a family of small-displacement three- and four-cylinder gasoline engines ranging from 1.0 L to 1.5 L, developed by Adam Opel AG, Shanghai Automotive Industry Corporation (SAIC), MG Motor (MG), Shanghai GM (SGM) and the Pan-Asia Technical Automotive Center (PATAC).

The new global family is designed to improve fuel economy, performance, and emissions, reduce noise and vibrations. To achieve this, it features lightweight design and advanced technologies like gasoline direct injection, turbocharging, variable length intake manifold and alternative fuel compatibility. It utilizes modular approach with interchangeable components that can be suited to specific application.

The initial engine variants include 
 I3 DI DCVCP turbo  stroke,
  I3 PFI  stroke, 
 I4 DI DCVCP turbo  stroke and 
 I4 PFI  stroke. All are derived from just two blocks (three and four cylinder) sharing a common  bore with  bore spacing. Mitsubishi Heavy Industries provides one-stage single-scroll turbocharger.

To aid with NVH (Noise, vibration, and harshness) levels the direct injection fuel rail mounts to the cylinder head and valve cover via bushings that isolate that loud ticking noise the injector pintles make. GM claims that the 1.0-liter turbo is 25 percent (3 dBA) quieter than the Ford Fiesta's 1.0-liter turbo, and the 1.4-liter is up to 50 percent (6 dBA) quieter than the VW/Audi 1.4-liter turbo. Other silencing measures include a bed-plate cylinder block that increases stiffness, a stiffened aluminum front cam cover. Three-cylinder variants get a counter-rotating (engine-speed) balance shaft that is integrated with the oil pump and located inside the two-piece aluminum oil pan to prevent radiated noise. GM claims the EcoTec triple will idle more smoothly than Ford's three-cylinder, which does not use a shaft.

All turbocharged variants will provide 90 percent of their max torque between 1500 and 5000 rpm, with peak power arriving between 5600 and 6000 rpm. The MHI turbos are sized to provide quick torque response, and are mounted very close to the cylinders, thanks to cylinder heads that incorporate the exhaust manifolds in the head.

To reduce mass, the engines are compact in all directions, made almost entirely of aluminum, and feature composite intake manifolds. This removes  from the existing 1.4-liter turbo in the Cruze and makes it  lighter than the 1.4-liter VW turbo. GM says this engine weighs , ready for installation.

The engines will debut in the 2014 Opel Adam and will be produced in Szentgotthárd, Hungary and GM's Flint Engine plant. The new engine family will spread to other brands and markets by the end of the decade and will replace three separate engine families (S-TEC, Family 0, and Family 1).

The engine is used in:
2014 Opel Adam
2014 MG GT
2014 Opel Corsa E
2014 Roewe 360
2015 MG GS
2016 Buick Encore Sport Touring
2015-16 Chevrolet Cruze
2016 Chevrolet Malibu
2016 Chevrolet Volt
2016 Chevrolet Spark
2016 Buick Envision
2016 Roewe e950 plug-in hybrid
2016 Roewe RX5
2017 Roewe i6
2017 MG 6
2017 Roewe i5
2018 Chevrolet Equinox
2018 MG HS
2018 MG ZS
The assembly lines for North American facilities were manufactured by Hirata Corporation at their powertrain facility in Kumamoto, Japan.

Non-Opel Variants

1.4

LV7
Compression ratio is 10.6:1 and the engine can run on regular unleaded grade gasoline. Assembly is in Changwon, South Korea.

LE2
Compression ratio is 10.0:1 and the engine can run on regular grade gasoline. The LE2 is also paired with Start-Stop technology in some vehicles.

1.5

L3A
The compression ratio is 12.5:1 and the engine can run on regular unleaded grade gasoline. Maximum engine speed is 6000 rpm.

LFV
Compression ratio is 10.0:1 and the engine can run on regular unleaded grade gasoline. Maximum engine speed is 6500 rpm. Automatic Start-Stop is available with this engine. Assembly is in Shanghai (China), Changwon (South Korea), Toluca (Mexico), Spring Hill (Tennessee) and Flint (Michigan).

LYX
Compression ratio is 10.0:1 and uses regular unleaded gasoline.

LSD
Compression ratio is 10.0:1 and uses regular unleaded gasoline. This variant has a higher pressure fuel system than the LYX, increasing to 35 MPa from 20 MPa.

Opel Variants

See also
GM Family 0 engine
GM Family 1 engine
Daewoo S-TEC engine
GM Medium Gasoline Engine
GM Medium Diesel engine
GM Ecotec engine
List of GM engines

References

External links

 http://gmpowertrain.com 
 http://media.opel.com/content/media/intl/en/opel/news.detail.html/content/Pages/news/intl/en/2013/opel/08-07-newall-aluminium-3-zylinder-turbo.html
 http://articles.sae.org/12970/

Small Gas Engine
Small Gas Engine
Straight-three engines
Straight-four engines
Gasoline engines by model